Internal representation may refer to:

 Mental representation, in man 
 Knowledge representation, in artificial intelligence
 Intermediate representation, the data structure or code used internally by a compiler or virtual machine to represent source code